Hela Msaad (born 1979) is a Tunisian handball player. She plays for the club A.S.E. Ariana and for the Tunisian national team.

She participated at the 2009 World Women's Handball Championship in China, where Tunisia placed 14th.

References

1979 births
Living people
Tunisian female handball players